Isaac Edward Holmes (April 6, 1796 – February 24, 1867) was a U.S. Representative from South Carolina.

Biography
Isaac Edward Holmes was born in Charleston, South Carolina, on April 6, 1796. He attended the common schools, received private tuition, and graduated from Yale College in 1815.  He studied law and was admitted to the bar in 1818.  He commenced practice in Charleston.

He served as member of the Charleston city council and then in the South Carolina House of Representatives in 1826-1829 and 1832-1833.

Holmes was elected as a Democrat to the Twenty-sixth and five succeeding Congresses (March 4, 1839 – March 3, 1851).  He served as chairman of the Committee on Commerce (Twenty-eighth Congress) and Committee on Naval Affairs (Twenty-ninth Congress).
After his tenure in Congress, he practiced law in San Francisco, California, from 1851 to 1854, when he returned to Charleston, South Carolina.  He again resided in San Francisco from 1857 to 1861.

He returned to South Carolina in 1861 and was appointed a commissioner of the state to confer with the federal government prior to the outbreak of the Civil War.

He died in Charleston on February 24, 1867, and was interred in Circular Churchyard.

Sources

1796 births
1867 deaths
Politicians from Charleston, South Carolina
People of South Carolina in the American Civil War
Yale College alumni
South Carolina city council members
Democratic Party members of the South Carolina House of Representatives
Democratic Party members of the United States House of Representatives from South Carolina
19th-century American politicians
Lawyers from Charleston, South Carolina
19th-century American lawyers